The Neuchâtel Open was a professional golf tournament that was played annually between 1982 and 2007 at Neuchâtel Golf Club in Saint-Blaise, Neuchâtel, Switzerland. It was a 54-hole stroke play tournament.

From 1990 to 2000 it was an event on the second-tier Challenge Tour, although it was an unofficial money event in some seasons. After being dropped from the Challenge Tour schedule, it became a fixture on the third-tier Alps Tour between 2001 and 2007.

Winners

Notes

References

External links
Coverage on the Challenge Tour's official site

Former Challenge Tour events
Golf tournaments in Switzerland
Recurring sporting events established in 1982
Recurring sporting events disestablished in 2007